South Carolina Highway 86 (SC 86) is a  state highway in the U.S. state of South Carolina. The highway connects the Easley and Piedmont areas.

Route description
SC 86 begins at an intersection with SC 8 (Pelzer Highway) south of Easley within Anderson County. It travels to the southeast and intersects SC 81. Then, it continues to the southeast and curves to the east just before an interchange with Interstate 85 (I-85) and U.S. Route 29 (US 29). Then, it enters Piedmont, where it crosses over the Saluda River on an unnamed bridge, enters Greenville County, and intersects SC 20 (Piedmont Highway). The highway crosses over Grove Creek on an unnamed bridge, before reaching its eastern terminus, an intersection with US 25 (Augusta Road). Here, the roadway continues as Sandy Springs Road.

History

South Carolina Highway 85

South Carolina Highway 85 (SC 85) was a state highway that was established from SC 8/SC 81 near Piedmont to U.S. Route 29 (US 29; now SC 20) in Piedmont. In 1938, it was decommissioned and redesignated as SC 86. Today, only the portion from just west of I-85 to Piedmont is part of SC 86.

Major intersections

See also

References

External links

SC 86 South Carolina Hwy Index

086
Transportation in Anderson County, South Carolina
Transportation in Greenville County, South Carolina